This is a list of songs that reached #1 on the RIAJ Digital Track Chart chart in Japan in 2011. The highest-selling digital singles in Japan are published by Recording Industry Association of Japan. PC downloads and ringtone downloads are not eligible for the chart, only cellphone downloads (Chaku-uta Full) count for the chart.

The chart week runs from Wednesday to Tuesday. The final week of 2010, starting December 28, was merged with the following week (12/29-1/4) due to New Year's celebrations.

Chart history

See also
List of number one Reco-kyō Chart singles 2006–2009

References

Number-one digital singles of 2011
Japan
Digital singles of 2011
Recording Industry Association of Japan